Ruslan Iosifovich Olikhver (born 11 April 1969) is a Russian former volleyball player of Latvian origin who competed for the Unified Team in the 1992 Summer Olympics and for Russia in the 1996 Summer Olympics and in the 2000 Summer Olympics.

In 1992 he was part of the Unified Team which finished seventh in the Olympic tournament. He played all eight matches.

Four years later he finished fourth with the Russian team in the 1996 Olympic tournament. He played five matches.

At the 2000 Games he was a member of the Russian team which won the silver medal in the Olympic tournament. He played all eight matches.

Club Honors
  Radiotechnik Riga, Soviet Top League (1989–1992);
- Soviet Top League Bronze Medalist (2) – 1990, 1991;
- CEV Cup Finalist (1) – 1991;
  Las Daytona Modena, Italian A1 League (1993–95);
- Italian A1 League Champion (1) – 1995;
- Italian Cup  Winner (2) – 1994, 1995;
- CEV Cup Winner's Cup Winner (1) – 1995;
  Report Suzano, Brazilian Superleague (1995–99);
- Brazilian Superleague Champion (1) – 1997;
- Brazilian Superleague Runner-up (2) – 1996, 1999;
- Brazilian Superleague Bronze Medalist (1) – 1998;
  TNT Alpitour Cuneo,  Italian A1 League (1999-00);
- Italian Supercup Winner (1) – 1999;
- CEV Cup Winner's Cup Finalist (1) – 2000;
  MGTU-Luzhniki Moscow, Russian Super League (2001–2002);
- Russian Super League Runner-up (1) – 2002;
  Dinamo Tattransgaz Kazan, Russian Super League (2002–06);
- Russian Super League Bronze Medalist (2) – 2004, 2005;
- Russian Cup Winner (1) – 2004;
  Fakel Novy Urengoy, Russian Super League (2006–07);
- CEV Cup Winner (1) – 2007;

External links
 

1969 births
Living people
Russian men's volleyball players
Soviet men's volleyball players
Volleyball players at the 1992 Summer Olympics
Volleyball players at the 1996 Summer Olympics
Volleyball players at the 2000 Summer Olympics
Olympic volleyball players of the Unified Team
Olympic volleyball players of Russia
Olympic silver medalists for Russia
Olympic medalists in volleyball
Sportspeople from Riga
Medalists at the 2000 Summer Olympics